Cullen and Elizabeth Jones House, also known as Ferry Road Farm, is a historic home located near Edenton, Chowan County, North Carolina. The original section was built about 1810, with later expansions.  It is a -story, three bay, asymmetrical vernacular coastal cottage with an engaged porch across the front façade. The house is of log and heavy timber-frame construction. It has a one-story rear, gable-roof ell and sits on a brick pier foundation. The house served as the post office for the rural community of Rockyhock from 1894 through 1906.  Also on the property are a contributing small frame agricultural outbuilding and family cemetery with seven marked graves.

It was listed on the National Register of Historic Places in 2006.

References

Houses on the National Register of Historic Places in North Carolina
Houses completed in 1810
Houses in Chowan County, North Carolina
National Register of Historic Places in Chowan County, North Carolina